The 2007–08 Libyan Second Division football championship took place between November 2007 and July 2008. The first round of matches were played between November 3 and November 5, 2007. The final round of games were played in July 2008.

Competition
43 sides competed in this edition of the competition, split into three groups. Groups A and B contained 27 sides from the surrounding areas of Tripoli, Zawiya, Misrata and Sabha. These were split into two groups, Group A with 14 sides, Group B with 13 sides. Group C contained 16 teams from the surrounding areas of Butnan, Benghazi, Jabal al Akhdar and Sirte.

Every side in each group played each other home and away; therefore, each team in Group A played 26 games, Group B 24 games, and Group C 32 games.

Promotion & Relegation
The team that finished top of each of the three groups won direct promotion to the Libyan Premier League, and would enter a mini-league at the end of the season to decide the winner of the competition. The team that finished second in each of the three groups entered a Relegation promotion play-off League, along with the 13th-placed side in the 2007–08 edition of the Libyan Premier League.

The bottom three sides in each of Group A and Group B, along with the bottom four sides in Group C were relegated to the Libyan Third Division.

Teams

Group A

 Wefaq Sabratha
 Rafik Sorman
 Alharaty
 Attahaddy Misrata
 Al Yarmouk
 Al Jamarek
 Ghawt al Sha'al
 Al Ikhaa
 Al Talae'e
 Al Faaluja
 Majd
 Abu Moliyana
 Asswehly

Group B

 Abi al Ashar
 Al Shouraa
 Al Manshea
 Hiyad
 Mahalla
 Dhahra
 Al Salaam
 Qurthabia
 Aman al Aam
 Al Taraabet
 Al Charara
 Nojoom al Baazah
 Al Mustaqbal

Group C

 Al Buraaq
 Najma
 Al Shalaal
 Mukhtar B.
 Afriqi
 Darnes
 Al Ta'awon
 Al Sawa'ed
 Al Tayaraan
 Hilal
 Al Murooj
 Andalus
 Benghazi al Jadeeda
 Al Baranes
 Mukhtar T.
 Wahda B.

League tables

Group A

Group B

Group C

Relegation/Promotion Playoff

Championship stage
This contained the three sides that topped each group. They had already won promotion to the Libyan Premier League.

Table

Fixtures and results

References

2007-08
2